Nicolás Martin Molina (born 28 January 1999) is an Argentine footballer.

Career

Youth and college 
Molina attended St. Catherine's Moorlands School in Buenos Aires, where he scored 69 goals in 73 games and was named Best Player of the Division in 2015. Molina also played with the academy of local side Boca de Zona Norte. He began attending Austral University in Argentina, before playing in a local amateur tournament that earned him a trial with River Plate, who he later signed for, leaving university to do so.

In 2019, Molina had the opportunity to move to the United States to play college soccer, earning a scholarship to attend St. Francis College in Brooklyn, New York. He made 35 appearances for the Terriers, scoring eight goals and tallying seven assists across three seasons, including a truncated season due to the COVID-19 pandemic. For the 2020–21 season, Molina was named NEC Men's Soccer Player of the Year.

For his senior year, Molina transferred to the University of North Carolina Wilmington, going on to score six times in 16 games for the Seahawks, and was a Second-Team All-Colonial Athletic Association selection.

Molina also played with USL League Two club West Virginia United during their 2021 season, where he earned both the 2021 League Two MVP award and the Golden Boot award after scoring 16 goals in just 13 games for the team in the regular season. His goals helped lead West Virginia to a third-place finish in the South Atlantic Division.

Professional 
On 17 February 2022, Molina signed with USL League One side North Carolina FC. He made his professional debut on 18 June 2022, starting and scoring during a 2–0 win over Charlotte Independence.

Personal
Nicólas is the younger brother of professional footballer Tomás Molina.

Honors

Individual
West Virginia United
USL League Two Golden Boot Award: 2021
USL League Two Most Valuable Player Award: 2021

References

External links 
 Nicolás Molina NCFC bio

1999 births
Living people
Argentine expatriate footballers
Argentine expatriate sportspeople in the United States
Argentine footballers
Association football forwards
Club Atlético River Plate footballers
North Carolina FC players
Sportspeople from Buenos Aires Province
St. Francis Brooklyn Terriers men's soccer players
UNC Wilmington Seahawks men's soccer players
USL League One players
USL League Two players
West Virginia Chaos players